Katangi tehsil is a fourth-order administrative and revenue division, a subdivision of third-order administrative and revenue division of Balaghat district of Madhya Pradesh.

Geography
Katangi tehsil has an area of 580.73 sqkilometers. It is bounded by Seoni district in the southwest, west, northwest and north, Lalbarra tehsil in the northeast, Waraseoni tehsil in the east, Khairlanji tehsil in the southeast and Tirodi tehsil in the south.

See also 
Balaghat district
K. D. Deshmukh
Tamlal Sahare

Citations

External links

Tehsils of Madhya Pradesh
Balaghat district